CHLA may refer to:

 Children's Hospital Los Angeles
 Chinese Hand Laundry Alliance
 Core Historical Literature of Agriculture